Jarrod Sammut (born 15 February 1987) is a Maltese international rugby league footballer who plays as a  or  for the Barrow Raiders in the BetFred Championship.

Sammut spent time on loan from the Wildcats at Featherstone Rovers, London and Workington Town in the Championship. He joined Workington on a permanent deal in the Kingstone Press Championship. He has also played for the Broncos and the Leigh Centurions in the second tier. Sammut is a dual-code international for Malta, having represented both the Malta national rugby league team and the Malta national rugby union team.

Early life
Sammut was born in Blacktown, New South Wales, Australia to parents Darren and Kim. He is of Indigenous Australian descent through his mother, and Maltese descent through his paternal grandparents.

He was educated at Patrician Brothers' College Blacktown and played junior rugby league for the Doonside Roos.

Playing career

Penrith Panthers
Sammut was a member of the Penrith Panthers squad that defeated Newcastle Knights in the 2006 Jersey Flegg Cup grand final. He made his NRL début for the Panthers on 4 August 2007 against the South Sydney Rabbitohs. On 30 September 2007, Sammut captained the Panthers' side in their Jersey Flegg Cup Grand Final, scoring 1 try, 3 goals, and 1 field goal in their 19-14 win over the Parramatta Eels.

Crusaders RL
In April 2010, Sammut was released from the final year of his Panthers' contract to join the Crusaders in the Super League on a two and a half year contract until the end of 2012. 

His arrival in Wales was delayed by volcanic ash and a broken down plane. The delay meant that Sammut made it to Wales only one day before the team headed to Edinburgh for the Magic Weekend. Despite the late arrival and jet lag, Sammut scored a try in his Crusaders debut.

Bradford Bulls
Sammut joined the Bradford Bulls in 2012 on a one-year contract. During the 2013 pre-season, he signed a new two-tier extension to his contract.

Wakefield Trinity Wildcats
After playing for the Bradford Bulls in a 2014 pre-season match, Sammut signed a two-year contract with the Wakefield Trinity Wildcats on 14 February 2014, one day before the start of the Super League season.

On 25 June 2014, Sammut joined Featherstone Rovers on a dual-registration. He played in their match against the North Wales Crusaders (the successor of his former club), kicking 10 goals from 10 attempts.

On 26 February 2015, Sammut joined the London Broncos on a dual-registration.

Workington Town
On 23 December 2015, Sammut signed with Workington Town.

London Broncos
Sammut signed a two-year deal with the London Broncos on 25 October 2016.

Leigh Centurions
On 5 December 2019 it was announced that Sammut would join the Leigh Centurions.

Barrow Raiders
On 3 December 2021, it was reported that he had signed for Barrow Raiders in the RFL Championship

Representative career

Rugby League
Sammut made his Test début for Malta on 8 October 2006 in their match against Lebanon. His 36-point haul against Norway in the 2011 European Shield equaled the record for most points scored by a player in an international match, according to the RLEF. Sammut was named in Malta's train-on squad for their 28 October 2016 Test match against Thailand. The match was cancelled following the death of Thailand's King Bhumibol Adulyadej.

Sammut has also represented Malta in non-Test matches. On 19 October 2007, he scored a try against the Royal Logistic Corps' rugby league team. In October 2009, Sammut represented Malta in the Australian Mediterranean (Aus-Med) Shield at Marconi Stadium in Sydney, a tournament made up completely of Australian residents, such as Blake Austin, John Skandalis and Cameron Ciraldo. Sammut played in both of Malta's games, against Italy and Portugal.

Rugby Union
On 25 October 2008, Sammut represented the Malta national rugby union team in their 2011 Rugby World Cup qualifying match against Croatia. He kicked 3 penalty goals and 1 conversion for a total of 11 points in Malta's 16-18 loss. Sammut was to also play against Sweden on 1 November 2008, but was pulled from the game after the NRL learned he was playing union, not league.

Club statistics

Personal life

Jarrod is married to Jessica. They were married in October 2017 in Santorini. They have 2 sons together, Jardii (born in 2014) and Jax (born in 2015).

References

External links

Wigan Warriors profile
SL profile
London Broncos profile
Penrith Panthers profile
Sammut at Rleague.com

1987 births
Living people
Australian people of Maltese descent
Australian rugby league players
Australian rugby union players
Australian expatriate sportspeople in England
Maltese expatriate sportspeople in England
Barrow Raiders players
Bradford Bulls players
Crusaders Rugby League players
Dual-code rugby internationals
Featherstone Rovers players
Leigh Leopards players
London Broncos players
Malta national rugby league team players
Penrith Panthers players
Rugby league five-eighths
Rugby league fullbacks
Rugby league halfbacks
Rugby league players from Blacktown
Rugby union players from Blacktown
Wakefield Trinity players
Windsor Wolves players
Workington Town players